Mikko Lehtonen is the name of:

Mikko Lehtonen (ice hockey, born 1978), Finnish ice hockey defenceman from Kiiminki
Mikko Lehtonen (ice hockey, born 1987), Finnish ice hockey forward from Espoo
Mikko Lehtonen (ice hockey, born 1994), Finnish ice hockey player from Turku